Lazar Weiner (October 24, 1897 in Cherkassy – January 10, 1982 in Flushing, Queens) was an Imperial Russian-born, American-naturalized composer of Yiddish song. He emigrated to America at the age of 17 and later became the music director of the Central Synagogue in Manhattan.

Works
Weiner composed more than 200 art songs as well as Yiddish and Hebrew cantatas and full synagogue services.

Selected recordings
 Milken Archive

External links
 Milken Archive Biography

References

American male classical composers
American classical composers
Kyiv Conservatory alumni
Musicians from New York City
Jews from the Russian Empire
Emigrants from the Russian Empire to the United States
1897 births
1982 deaths
Jewish classical composers
20th-century classical composers
20th-century American composers
20th-century American male musicians
American people of Russian-Jewish descent
Jewish American classical composers
Naturalized citizens of the United States
20th-century American Jews